Silver Hill is an unincorporated community in Chattooga County, in the U.S. state of Georgia.

History
A post office called Silver Hill was in operation from 1891 until 1899. The community supposedly was named from deposits of silver in the area.

References

Unincorporated communities in Chattooga County, Georgia
Unincorporated communities in Georgia (U.S. state)